Dianella intermedia, is a perennial herb of the family Asphodelaceae, subfamily Hemerocallidoideae, found in the Australian territories of Lord Howe Island and Norfolk Island. It was first described by Stephan Endlicher in 1833. It grows to 2 feet with pale violet flowers followed by turquoise berries.

References

 Flora of Australia entry
 Mostly Natives entry
 Prodr. fl. Norfolk. 28. 1833
 Hnatiuk, R. J. 1990. Census of Australian vascular plants. Australian Flora and Fauna Series No. 11.

External links

intermedia
Flora of Lord Howe Island
Flora of Norfolk Island
Plants described in 1833